4057 Demophon  is a larger Jupiter trojan from the Greek camp, approximately  in diameter. It was discovered on 15 October 1985 by American astronomer Edward Bowell at the Anderson Mesa Station of the Lowell Observatory near Flagstaff, Arizona. The dark Jovian asteroid has a longer-than-average rotation period of 29.8 hours. It was named after the Athen prince Demophon who fought in the Trojan War.

Orbit and classification 

Demophon is a dark Jovian asteroid in a 1:1 orbital resonance with Jupiter. It is located in the leading Greek camp at the Gas Giant's  Lagrangian point, 60° ahead on its orbit . It is also a non-family asteroid of the Jovian background population.

It orbits the Sun at a distance of 4.6–5.9 AU once every 12 years and 1 month (4,410 days; semi-major axis of 5.26 AU). Its orbit has an eccentricity of 0.12 and an inclination of 3° with respect to the ecliptic. The body's observation arc begins with a precovery taken at Crimea–Nauchnij in September 1985, just three weeks prior to its official discovery observation at Anderson Mesa.

Physical characteristics 

Demophon is an assumed, carbonaceous C-type asteroid. It has a high V–I color index of 1.06. Most larger Jupiter trojans are D-type asteroids.

Rotation period 

In June 1994, a first rotational lightcurve of Demophon was obtained from photometric observations by Stefano Mottola and Anders Erikson using the Dutch 0.9-metre Telescope at ESO's La Silla Observatory in Chile. Lightcurve analysis gave a rotation period of 29.31 hours with a brightness variation of 0.23 magnitude.

In August 2015, photometric observations by the Kepler space telescope rendered another two lightcurves. The best-rated one showed a period of  hours and a brightness variation of 0.21 magnitude. Most asteroids have a shorter rotation period between 2 and 20 hours (also see List of slow rotators).

Diameter and albedo 

According to the survey carried out by the NEOWISE mission of NASA's Wide-field Infrared Survey Explorer, Demophon measures 45.68 kilometers in diameter and its surface has an albedo of 0.077, while the Collaborative Asteroid Lightcurve Link assumes a standard albedo for a carbonaceous asteroid of 0.057 and calculates a diameter of 53.16 kilometers based on an absolute magnitude of 10.1.

Naming 

This minor planet was named from Greek mythology after the Athen prince Demophon, son of King Theseus and Phaedra. After participation in the Trojan War, Demophon married Phyllis, who committed suicide after he had abandoned her. The official naming citation was published by the Minor Planet Center on 22 April 1997.

References

External links 
 Asteroid Lightcurve Database (LCDB), query form (info )
 Dictionary of Minor Planet Names, Google books
 Discovery Circumstances: Numbered Minor Planets (1)-(5000) – Minor Planet Center
 Asteroid 4057 Demophon at the Small Bodies Data Ferret
 
 

004057
Discoveries by Edward L. G. Bowell
Named minor planets
19851015